John Thompson Leckie (3 March 1906 — 1977) was a Scottish footballer who played as a goalkeeper.

Career
Leckie played for Alva Albion, Alloa Athletic, St Johnstone, Raith Rovers and Bray Unknowns before moving down to England to sign with Port Vale in March 1932. He picked up an injury in only his second game in 1931–32, and was sidelined until the start of his second season at The Old Recreation Ground. During that season he had a period from November 1932 to February 1933 as second choice keeper behind previous favourite Ben Davies, though in March he was injured once more, and Leckie played 22 games. He left on a free transfer by May 1933 and moved on to Stockport County in 1933–34, dropping down to the Third Division North from the Second Division. He was then Cardiff City's first team goalkeeper in 1934–35, as the Welsh club struggled near the bottom of the Third Division South. He later turned out for Walsall and Carlisle United.

Career statistics
Source:

References

1906 births
1977 deaths
Sportspeople from Clackmannanshire
Scottish footballers
Association football goalkeepers
Alloa Athletic F.C. players
St Johnstone F.C. players
Raith Rovers F.C. players
Bray Unknowns F.C. players
Port Vale F.C. players
Stockport County F.C. players
Cardiff City F.C. players
Walsall F.C. players
Carlisle United F.C. players
English Football League players